Three Fountains Abbey may refer to:
Trois-Fontaines Abbey, in France
Tre Fontane Abbey, in Italy